The 1952 Kent State Golden Flashes football team was an American football team that represented Kent State University in the Mid-American Conference (MAC) during the 1952 college football season. In their seventh season under head coach Trevor J. Rees, the Golden Flashes compiled a 5–4 record (2–2 against MAC opponents), finished in fifth place in the MAC, and outscored all opponents by a combined total of 204 to 180.

The team's statistical leaders included Jim Cullom with 822 rushing yards, 822 yards of total offense, and 74 receiving yards. Offensive tackle Al Kilgore was selected as a first-team All-MAC player.

Schedule

References

Kent State
Kent State Golden Flashes football seasons
Kent State Golden Flashes football